Conexibacter woesei is a Gram-positive and mesophilic bacterium from the genus of Conexibacter which has been isolated from forest soil in Italy.

References

Further reading 
 

 

Actinomycetota
Bacteria described in 2003